Siniša Malešević, MRIA, MAE (born 5 April 1969 in Banja Luka, Bosnia and Herzegovina) is an Irish academic who is Full Professor/Chair of Sociology at the University College, Dublin, Ireland. He is also a Senior Fellow and Associate Researcher at Conservatoire national des arts et métiers (CNAM), Paris, France.

Education

Malešević completed his high school education at the New Bern High School, North Carolina, USA in 1988. He graduated in sociology from the University of Zagreb, Croatia in 1993. He received his MA from the Lancaster University, UK and the Central European University, Prague, Czech Republic in 1995. He subsequently completed his PhD in sociology from the University College Cork, Ireland in 1999 [1].

Career and research interests
Malesevic's research interests include the comparative-historical and theoretical study of ethnicity, nation-states, nationalism, empires, ideology, war, violence and sociological theory. 

Previously he held research and teaching appointments at the Institute for International Relations (Zagreb), the Centre for the Study of Nationalism, CEU (Prague)- where he worked with late Ernest Gellner -, and at the National University of Ireland, Galway. He also held visiting professorships and fellowships at Université Libre de Bruxelles (Eric Remacle Chair in Conflict and Peace Studies), the Institute for Human Sciences, Vienna, the London School of Economics, Uppsala University, and the Netherlands Institute for Advanced Study in the Humanities and Social Sciences, Amsterdam [1]. 

In March 2010 he was elected a Member of the Royal Irish Academy, in December 2012 he was elected associated member of Academy of Sciences and Arts of Bosnia and Herzegovina and in August 2014 he was elected a Member of Academia Europaea [2].

Publications
Malesevic is author of ten and editor of nine books and volumes including monographs Ideology, Legitimacy and the New State (2002), The Sociology of Ethnicity (2004), Identity as Ideology (2006) The Sociology of War and Violence (2010), Nation-States and Nationalisms (2013), The Rise of Organised Brutality (2017), Grounded Nationalisms (2019) and Why Humans Fight (2022). The Rise of Organised Brutality is a recipient of the 2018 outstanding book award from the American Sociological Association's Peace, War and Social Conflict Section [3] and 'Grounded Nationalisms' was a runner up (honorable mention) in 2020 Stein Rokkan Prize for Comparative Social Science Research [4]. 

He has also authored over 120 peer-reviewed journal articles and book chapters and has given more than 150 invited talks all over the world [2]. 

His work has been translated into numerous languages including Albanian, Arabic, Chinese, Croatian, French, Indonesian, Japanese, Persian, Portuguese, Serbian, Spanish, Turkish, and Russian.

Selected publications 
(2002). Ideology after Poststructuralism. London: Pluto (co-edited with I. Mackenzie).
(2002). Making Sense of Collectivity: Ethnicity, Nationalism and Globalization. London: Pluto (co-edited with M. Haugaard).
(2002). Ideology, Legitimacy and the New State: Yugoslavia, Serbia and Croatia. London: Routledge (Serbian translation 2004).
(2004). The Sociology of Ethnicity. London: Sage (Serbian translation 2009; Persian translation 2011 and 2012; Turkish translation 2019; Indonesian translation in preparation).
(2006). Identity as Ideology: Understanding Ethnicity and Nationalism. New York: Palgrave Macmillan (Persian translation 2017).
(2007). Ernest Gellner and Contemporary Social Thought. Cambridge: Cambridge University Press (co-edited with M. Haugaard).
(2010). The Sociology of War and Violence. Cambridge: Cambridge University Press (Croatian translation 2011; Turkish translation 2018; Persian translation 2021; Chinese translation 2021; Arabic translation 2021).
(2011). Sociological Theory and Warfare. Stockholm: Forsvarshogskolan (Spanish translation 2015).
(2013). Nationalism and War. Cambridge: Cambridge University Press (co-edited with J.A. Hall).
(2013). Nation-States and Nationalisms: Organisation, Ideology and Solidarity. Cambridge: Polity (Croatian translation 2017, Persian translation forthcoming in 2023).
(2017). The Rise of Organised Brutality: A Historical Sociology of Violence. Cambridge: Cambridge University Press (Spanish translation 2020; Arabic translation forthcoming in 2023, Turkish translation forthcoming in 2023, Chinese translation forthcoming in 2023).
(2019). Grounded Nationalisms: A Sociological Analysis. Cambridge: Cambridge University Press (Croatian translation 2021).
(2021). Classical Sociological Theory. London: Sage (with S. Loyal).
(2021). Contemporary Sociological Theory. London: Sage (with S. Loyal) (Persian translation forthcoming in 2023).
(2022). Why Humans Fight: The Social Dynamics of Close-Range Violence. Cambridge: Cambridge University Press.

Personal life
In 2017, he has signed the Declaration on the Common Language of the Croats, Serbs, Bosniaks and Montenegrins.

References

Sources 
[1] http://www.ucd.ie/research/people/sociology/professorsinisamalesevic/
[2] http://www.ucd.ie/warstudies/members/siniamaleevic/
[3] http://www.asanet.org/asa-communities/asa-sections/current-sections/peace-war-and-social-conflict/section-peace-war-and-social-conflict-past-award-recipients
[4] https://www.ucd.ie/sociology/newsandevents/latestnews/grounded-nationalisms-2020-rokkan/
https://ecpr.eu/news/news/details/611
https://sinisa2malesevic.wordpress.com/
https://www.ria.ie/sinisa-malesevic
https://anubih.ba/index.php/bs/clanstvo/clanovi
http://www.ae-info.org/ae/User/Malesevic_Sinisa
https://esd.cnam.fr/membres/sinisa-malesevic-1114070.kjsp?RH=1570546542219
https://elpais.com/cultura/2020/08/27/babelia/1598517337_524599.html

1969 births
Living people
People from Banja Luka
Members of the Royal Irish Academy
Members of Academia Europaea
Scholars of nationalism
Scholars of war
Signatories of the Declaration on the Common Language
Academics of University College Dublin